The Apostolic Vicariate of San Jose in Mindoro is a Latin Church missionary jurisdiction or apostolic vicariate of the Catholic Church in the western part of Mindoro island in the Philippines. Its cathedra is within the Cathedral of St. Joseph the Worker, in the episcopal see of San Jose.

History 
The Apostolic Vicariate of San Jose, Occidental Mindoro was created on Jan. 27, 1983, by Pope John Paul II, who appointed the Most Rev. Vicente C. Manuel, SVD as the first Apostolic Vicar. He was ordained bishop on June 29, 1983. The second Vicar Apostolic, Most Rev. Antonio P. Palang, SVD was ordained bishop on May 31, 2002 at Saint Joseph Cathedral. He resigned on March 17, 2018 due to his health condition, and died on April 21, 2021. Bishop William Antonio of the Diocese of Ilagan is the concurrent Administrator. The Apostolic Vicariate of San Jose in Mindoro comprises the civil province of Occidental Mindoro and its 11 municipalities. Its titular patron is St. Joseph the Worker whose feast is celebrated May 1 in the vicariate, and Our Lady of Fatima, its secondary patroness, whose feast is celebrated May 13.

Ordinaries

References

External links 
 GCatholic
 Catholic Hierarchy
 CBCP website (archive)

1983 establishments in the Philippines
Apostolic vicariates
Roman Catholic dioceses in the Philippines
Religion in Occidental Mindoro